Premiere is the debut album by Welsh mezzo-soprano Katherine Jenkins, released on 5 April 2004, in the UK. It charted at number 31 on the UK Albums Chart, and at number 1 on the UK Classical Album Chart.

Track listing
 "Questo è per te" 3:39
 "Ash Grove" 3:09
 "Ave Maria" 3:01
 "Bailero" 2:51
 "Lord Is My Shepherd" 4:22
 "Ar Lan Y Mor" 2:30
 "Sweetest Love" 3:58
 "Habanera" 2:48
 "Cymru Fach" 3:55
 "Caro Mio Ben" 2:14
 "Lascia Ch'io Pianga" 3:14
 "Miserere" 3:54
 "Absence" 3:00
 "Cwm Rhondda" 2:48

Certifications

References

Katherine Jenkins albums
2004 debut albums
Universal Classics and Jazz albums